Zieria tuberculata, commonly known as warty zieria, is a plant in the citrus family Rutaceae and is endemic to a small area on the south coast of New South Wales. It is a shrub with warty, hairy branches and leaves and large groups of creamy-white, four-petalled flowers in late winter to spring.

Description
The leaflets are dull green on the upper surface, whitish and warty on the lower side.

The flowers are creamy-white and are arranged in upper leaf axils in large groups of up to 200. In common with other zierias, there are only four stamens. Flowering occurs from late winter to spring.

Taxonomy and naming
Zieria tuberculata was first formally described in 2002 by James Armstrong and the description was published in Australian Systematic Botany. The specific epithet (tuberculata) is a Latin word meaning "full of lumps".

Distribution and habitat
This zieria occurs in the Mount Gulaga area, growing in exposed, rocky outcrops on the edge of rainforest.

Ecology
This species is pollinated by pollen-feeding beetles and flies and by nectar-feeding flies.

Conservation
Zieria tuberculata is listed as "Vulnerable" under the Commonwealth Government Environment Protection and Biodiversity Conservation Act 1999 (EPBC) Act and under the New South Wales NSW Threatened Species Conservation Act. The main threats to its survival are habitat destruction caused by grazing animals and the weeds lantata (Lantana camara) and ivy (Hedera helix).

References

tuberculata
Sapindales of Australia
Flora of New South Wales
Plants described in 2002